Delta Tau Lambda is a collegiate and professional Latina-based Greek-lettered sorority. It was founded on April 2, 1994  at the University of Michigan by Darilís García and Maria Victoria Ramos with a vision to empower women across the United States and create a network that provides opportunities. 

Women are eligible to join regardless of race, ethnicity, creed, sexual orientation, ability or national origin. The sorority has ten collegiate and six professional/alumni chapters in the United States.

Undergraduate, graduate and professional members engage in community service projects and fundraising for charitable causes; service endeavors encompass both national and local efforts. Community projects are said to include Thanksgiving baskets and child welfare, as well as national projects such as the American Diabetes Association walk and Race for the Cure. Many projects focus on the Latina/Latino community, including a scholarship fund.

History

Delta Tau Lambda was founded by Darilís García and Maria Victoria Ramos on April 2, 1994. It was the first Latina-based sorority in the Ann Arbor campus.

The founders, Darilís García and Maria Victoria Ramos focused their efforts on academic achievement, community service and professionalism, as well as supporting causes related to breast cancer, diabetes, HIV/AIDS and mental health. That fall they hosted the first Salute to Latinas, Fuerza de la Mujer Latina, which has become a staple event for the sorority. In March of 1995 the founders created the Lydia Cruz and Sandra Maria Ramos Scholarship, named after Darilís’ grandmother and Maria's older sister.

The first line of the organization—Alejandra Montes, Carmela Kudyba, and Adriana Rendon—was initiated on April 5, 1996. The sorority tag line, "Women by chance, sisters by choice, phenomenal by nature,"  was created by Damaris Madrigal. The Beta chapter was established in 1999 at Roosevelt University by Michelle Gonzalez and Rocio Dominguez. In 2003, the first graduate chapter was created for the Detroit metropolitan area.

Scholarship

The Lydia Cruz & Sandra Maria Ramos Scholarship Fund was established in March of 1995. The scholarship is named after Darilís García's grandmother and Maria Victoria Ramos' sister. The scholarship is awarded annually to a graduating high school Latina senior that will be attending a two or four-year higher learning institution or a first-year Latina student at a two or four-year higher learning institution.

Chapters

Collegiate

Graduate Professional

Citations

References

External links
Delta Tau Lambda National website

 Student societies in the United States
 Organizations based in Ann Arbor, Michigan
1994 establishments in Illinois
 Latino fraternities and sororities
 Student organizations established in 1994